Jay Henderson (born 21 February  2002) is a Scottish professional footballer who plays for Scottish Championship club Inverness Caledonian Thistle, on loan from Scottish Premiership club St Mirren, as a midfielder.

Career
Raised in Kilmarnock, Henderson began his career in the youth system at St Mirren; he was loaned to Clyde in September 2020. He made his first team debut for St Mirren in a 1–0 Scottish Premiership defeat to Motherwell on 10 April 2021.

On 30 December 2022, Henderson joined Scottish Championship side Inverness Caledonian Thistle on loan until the end of the season.

Personal life
His father Darren was also a footballer.

References

2002 births
Living people
Scottish footballers
Footballers from Irvine, North Ayrshire
Association football midfielders
St Mirren F.C. players
Clyde F.C. players
Inverness Caledonian Thistle F.C. players
Scottish Professional Football League players
Scotland under-21 international footballers